Elkhart Lake-Glenbeulah High School is a public high school located in Elkhart Lake, Wisconsin, United States. It serves grades 9-12 and is part of the Elkhart Lake-Glenbeulah School District. Elkhart Lake-Glenbeulah High School has 158 students.

Athletics
Elkhart Lake-Glenbeulah high school offers the following sports:
 Golf
 Girls' soccer
 Boys' soccer (co-op with New Holstein School District)
 Track & Field
 Baseball
 JV Baseball
 Softball
 Football
 Volleyball
 Cross country
 Swimming (co-op with Kohler School District)
 Boys' basketball
 Girls' basketball
 Wrestling  
Elkhart Lake-Glenbeulah High School's athletic teams are known as the Resorters. In fall 2015 the school became a member of the Olympic Conference/Central Lakeshore Conference.

References

External links
Elkhart Lake-Glenbeulah High School
Greatschools.net - Elkhart Lake High School
Public high schools in Wisconsin
Schools in Sheboygan County, Wisconsin